La Machine is a French production company based in Nantes, France, which is famous for La Princesse, a 50-foot mechanical spider constructed in Nantes, France.

Background
The group was formed by artists, designers, fabricators and technicians in early 1990s and is currently led by François Delarozière, Artistic Director and creator of La Princesse.  It is known for its theatrical machines, permanent installations, and also its own theatrical productions.

Past productions

1999

Le Manège d'Andrea
Le Manège d'Andrea is a art carousel made of steel, wood, and copper. Instead of horses, the merry-go-round has non-traditional animals including a stag beetle, a blowfish, 
and a sea monster, as well as objects such as an ocean liner and a biplane.

2003

Symphonie Mécanique
A classical live performance in collaboration with industrial machines. Scores were composed by Dominique Malan.

Le Grand Répertoire
Exhibition of machines created to be shown in public places. Has visited Nantes, Calais, Antwerp, Toulouse, and Marseille, as well as Paris in 2006, where it was seen by over 50,000 people.

2007

Les Machines de l'Île
Les Machines de l'Île or Machines of the Isle of Nantes is a gallery containing Le Grand Éléphant, as well as other creations by La Machine, which the public can visit. It is at the edge of the river Loire, in an old shipyard. Other productions are expected to appear there, with Le Carrousel du Monde Marins, a merry-go-round, opened to the public in 2012 but also La Galerie des Machines, a place where new productions are exposed to be tested by the audience.

2008

Le Manège Carré Sénart
Le Manège Carré Sénart is a square merry-go-round, which showed off insects and buffalo, and appeared just outside Paris. It is scheduled to visit Madrid in late 2008, and St Petersburg in 2009.

La Princesse
A 60-foot mechanical spider named La Princesse was installed in Liverpool in early September 2008, as part of the city's European Capital of Culture 2008 celebrations. It was operated by 12 people controlling the 8 legs and other movements of the spider. It was toured around city landmarks such as St George's Hall and the Albert Dock, and was seen walking down streets and climbing onto the side of a derelict tower block at the end of each performance. The performance was seen by Liverpool residents and tourists estimated at estimated 150,000 over the weekend, despite the poor weather, and attracted worldwide media attention to the city. The show's £1.8 million price tag was criticised by some.

See also 
 Royal de Luxe - a similar French mechanical marionette street theatre company

References

External links
La Machine's home page
 La Machine's webpage on the Liverpool event
Liverpool City of European Culture webpage on the event
Main BBC webpage (portal) about the event
BBC Liverpool 08 portal with many videos
Blog post containing videos of La Princesse

Performance artist collectives
Robotics companies
Entertainment companies of France
French artist groups and collectives
Culture of Pays de la Loire
Companies based in Pays de la Loire
Nantes